Jacques-Nompar III de Caumont, duc de La Force (18 April 1714 – 14 July 1755) was a French nobleman and peer, the son of Armand-Nompar II de Caumont, duc de La Force and Anne-Elisabeth Gruel de Boismont. He held the title of Marquis de La Force until he succeeded his father as duc de La Force in 1761.

Marriage and issue
He married, 8 April 1730, Marie Louise de Noailles (1710-1782), daughter of Adrien Maurice de Noailles and Françoise Charlotte Amable d'Aubigné. The marriage was childless.

He died 14 July 1755 at Bagnières.

Footnotes

Sources

External links
 Jacques Nompar de Caumont Family tree
 Seigneurs de Caumont-La Force Lineage of the lords of Caumont and Dukes of La Force

1714 births
1755 deaths
Dukes of La Force
Marquesses of La Force
18th-century peers of France